Ludwik Margules Coben (December 15, 1933 in Warsaw, Poland – March 10, 2006 in Mexico City, Mexico) was a Polish-born Mexican theatre, opera and film director. Being an active member of the Mexican theatre circuit for more than fifty years, Margules taught acting and directing methods in several institutions, eventually founding his own acting academy, the Foro Teatro Contemporáneo (Contemporary Theatre Forum) in 1991. 

He directed over 40 operas and plays. One of his most outstanding works was his 1982 production of De la vida de las marionetas, based on Ingmar Bergman's film From the Life of the Marionettes (1980).

He was given Mexico's National Prize for Science and Arts in 2003.

References

External links

Article about his death
Article about his career and legacy

1933 births
2006 deaths
20th-century Polish Jews
Polish emigrants to Mexico
Deaths from cancer in Mexico
Mexican film directors
Mexican theatre directors